P.Z.L. P.8 was a fighter designed by Ing. Zygmunt Puławski and constructed by  P.Z.L. (Państwowe Zakłady Lotnicze - National Aviation Establishments) from 1930.

Design and development

The P.8 was loosely based on the P.1, retaining the slab-sided fuselage and strut braced gull wing characteristic of Pulawski's fighters throughout the 1930s. The two fighter designs which emerged were designated P.8 and P.9, re-using the designations of two seaplane designs that had been rejected by the Polish Navy. Two power-plants were fitted to the two prototypes; the P.8/I was fitted with a  Hispano-Suiza 12Mc; the P.8/II was fitted with a  Lorraine 12Hfrs Pétrel Chasse.

The airframe of the P.8 continued Pulawski's theme of semi-monocoque stressed skin Aluminium alloy structure with fabric covered control surfaces. The wings were built up around two I-section Aluminium alloy spars with alloy ribs and finely corrugated sheet Duralumin. High set gull style wings were attached to the upper fuselage with about 5 degrees dihedral out to the joint between centre-section and outer wings which had zero dihedral. Support for the wings came from pairs of struts attached to the lower fuselage and at the thickest section of the outer wings at about 1/3span. A fixed tail-wheel undercarriage consisted of strut mounted mainwheels attached to the fuselage at the wing strut attachment points and a steel shod tail-skid. Cooling for the engine was achieved by a large radiator bath under the rear fuselage on the P.8/I and by special surface heat exchangers under the rear fuselage of the P.8/II. The special heat exchangers caused cooling difficulties and were replaced by small radiators either side of the rear fuselage aft of the cockpit.

Flight testing of the first prototype began in 1931, with the second prototype following in 1932, competing in that year's International Air Meeting in Warsaw and the 1932 Salon de l'Aeronautique at Paris. The P.8/I was also due to appear at the 1932 Zurich Meeting, replacing the P.8/II but was damaged beyond repair during a landing at Innsbruck. Beset by cooling problems and with the death of Pulawski in 1931, the Department of Aeronautics could not be persuaded to continue with development of V-12 powered fighters, continuing development of the radial engined P.Z.L. P.7. Production versions of the P.8 would have been designated P.8 for Hispano-Suiza powered versions, P.9 for Lorraine Pétrel powered versions and P.10 for a proposed  Rolls-Royce Kestrel powered derivative.

Variants
P.8/I
The first prototype powered by a Hispano-Suiza 12Mc engine.
P.8/II
The second prototype powered by a Lorraine 12Hfrs Pétrel Chasse engine.
P.9
Production version of the P.8/II, powered by a Pétrel engine.
P.10
A proposed version to be powered by a Rolls-Royce Kestrel engine.

Specifications (PZL P.8/II)

See also

References 

Gull-wing aircraft
PZL aircraft
Single-engined tractor aircraft
Aircraft first flown in 1931